Sankuru Nature Reserve is a protected area in the Democratic Republic of the Congo. It was created in November 2007 to protect a forest area home to bonobo, okapi and African forest elephant. The reserve has not been managed effectively, and suffers from ongoing deforestation and bushmeat hunting.

Creation

The purpose was to protect the Sankuru and Lokenye hydrographic basin to guarantee the flows of rivers in the Congo Basin and to conserve important animal biodiversity, including specifically the Bonobo, Okapi and Forest Elephant.

Description

The Sankuru Nature Reserve is the first large reserve in the Congo to be managed by indigenous people.
It is the largest continuous protected area for great apes in the world.
It won the first REDD+ (Reducing emissions from deforestation and forest degradation) contract in the Democratic Republic of the Congo.
REDD+ fights climate change, but also protects biodiversity and supports local people.
Fauna include bonobo, okapi, elephants, Hamlyn's monkey, blue monkey and at least 8 other primate species.

Rivers

The Lomela River flows in a northwest direction from the Sankuru Nature Reserve and across the Salonga National Park.
The Busira River forms a few miles west of Boende where the Lomela River joins the Tshuapa River from the left.
The Tshuapa rises in the southeast of the Sankuru Nature Reserve and meanders north-northwest and then west-northwest direction to its confluence with the Lomela River.
The Lukenie River rises near Katako-Kombe to the south of the reserve.

Issues

Satellite imagery shows that the reserve continues to steadily lose forest coverage.
The main driver for deforestation is growth of agriculture.
Roads built to provide access to the logging area have let commercial hunters gain access to wildlife for sale as bushmeat in the large cities.

See also
Kokolopori Bonobo Reserve

References

Sources

 
Protected areas of the Democratic Republic of the Congo
Protected areas established in 2007